Stewart Gustav Steven (born Stefan Gustaf Cohen; 30 September 1935 – 19 January 2004) was a British newspaper editor and journalist who grew circulation but whose career was marked by three major errors.

Biography 

Born in Hamburg to Jewish parents, Steven fled to England with his parents in 1941 as a refugee. He subsequently became a journalist with the Central Press, then the Western Daily Press, and from 1963 with the Daily Express.  At the Express, he was a political reporter, diplomatic correspondent and finally foreign editor, before becoming an assistant editor of the Daily Mail in 1972, and associate editor in 1974.

In 1972 the Daily Express reported a "world exclusive" that Martin Bormann, Hitler's deputy, was living in South America.  After six days, the paper realised it was a hoax.  Steven left for the Daily Mail.  In 1977, he took responsibility for the publication of a false story claiming that British Leyland had a fund to pay bribes.

In 1982, he became editor of the Mail on Sunday, serving until 1992, when he became editor of the Evening Standard.  In 1995, he printed a story critical of Tony Blair under the name of Bryan Gould, a former member of the Labour Party's shadow cabinet; in fact, Conservative Party Home Secretary Michael Howard's teenage son Nick had written the article.  Steven retired later in the year, serving as the last Chairman of Punch and on the board of the London Film Commission.

Steven was an early enthusiast for the London Eye.  He enjoyed cricket and rugby. He supported the arts, both personally and in his newspapers.

When he married a half Russian half Polish pop singer in 1965, he adopted her son and raised him as his own.  She took up painting after retiring from music.  At the time of his death he was caring for her; she suffered from multiple sclerosis.

Books

References

1935 births
2004 deaths
English newspaper editors
English male journalists
London Evening Standard people
Jewish emigrants from Nazi Germany to the United Kingdom
Daily Mail journalists